Doris Coley (August 2, 1941 – February 4, 2000) was an American musician, who was best known as a member (and occasional lead singer) of The Shirelles. She initially left the group in 1968, but returned in 1975. 
Through marriages, she became Doris Coley Kenner and later, Doris Kenner Jackson.

Personal life 
Coley was born in Goldsboro, North Carolina but moved with her family to Passaic, New Jersey. With schoolmates Shirley Owens (later Shirley Alston Reeves), Addie "Micki" Harris and Beverly Lee, she formed the Shirelles in Passaic in 1958, one of the 1st all-girl groups of the rock era. The four teenagers did not graduate with their class of 1958, but they earned diplomas later. They performed their self-written "I Met Him on a Sunday" for Florence Greenberg and was signed to her Tiara label (the song was so popular, it was bought by Decca Records). Many years later, in 1994, when the Rhythm and Blues Foundation gave the Shirelles a Heritage Award, Kenner sang with the group's other surviving members, Ms. Alston Reeves and Ms. Lee, for the first time in 19 years (Harris having died in 1982). The threesome met again when they were inducted into the Rock 'n' Roll Hall of Fame in 1996.

Death
Coley died of breast cancer at the age of 58 on February 4, 2000.

References

1941 births
2000 deaths
20th-century American women singers
American women pop singers
Musicians from Passaic, New Jersey 
The Shirelles members
Deaths from breast cancer
Deaths from cancer in California
20th-century American singers